Marsha Stevens-Pino (born Marsha Carter August 20, 1952) is a singer, musician, songwriter and recording artist of Christian songs.

For Those Tears I Died and "Children of the Day"
Shortly after professing to become a Christian in 1969 at sixteen years of age, Stevens-Pino wrote "For Those Tears I Died (Come to the Water)", a song that was to become widely known and sung in Charismatic Christian churches and youth-groups across the United States. Utilizing her songwriting and singing talents with sister Wendy Carter and friends Peter Jacobs and Russ Stevens, the contemporary Christian music group known as "Children of the Day" was formed. The band's first album, Come to the Water, was recorded with money borrowed from Calvary Chapel, whose minister Chuck Smith supported Stevens-Pino's career. However, her later memoir accounts that he enforced female subordination, including appointing a male bandmate as leader of the band. Smith's mentoring ended when she came out and Smith suggested that she hadn't "married the right man."

An entry in the Encyclopedia of Contemporary Christian Music states that Stevens should be recognized as the mother of the genre.

Albums
 Songs of Praise in a Strange Land
 Is this the real you?
 In Retrospect
 The Waiting's Over
 The Gift is on the inside
 UP (Unashamed Praise)
I Will Not Behave Like Prey
I Found You
You Called Us Good

Personal life 
Stevens-Pino married Russ Stevens in the 1970s and they were together for seven years before divorcing. The judge gave Stevens half the royalties of all her songs, as well as custody of their children. She married Cindy Stevens-Pino in August 2003 and they ran a music ministry training school for LGBT+ Christians at King of Peace MCC in St. Petersburg FL. They currently lead BALM Ministries and attend Pass-a-Grille Community Church.

When she came out as a lesbian after her divorce from Stevens, she faced much vitriol from the conservative Christian community. People tore her songs out of hymnals and songbooks and sent her hate mail.

See also 
https://www.balmministries.net/home

https://www.facebook.com/marsha.stevens

References 

 Stowe, David W. No Sympathy for the Devil: Christian Rock and the Rise of the Religious Right, The University of North Carolina Press, April 25, 2011,

External links
BALM Ministries 
Vintage footage of Marsha Stevens and Children of the Day performing "For Those Tears I Died" on the Kathryn Kuhlman television program, c. 1971 
Christian Century Magazine, March 17, 1999 by Mark Allan Powell; Marsha's tears: An orphan of the church 
Children of the Day History
Marsha Stevens-Pino profile on lgbtran.org
MCC congregation hears Christian singer’s inspiring story

1955 births
American women singer-songwriters
American singer-songwriters
Composers of Christian music
Christian music songwriters
American LGBT singers
American LGBT songwriters
Jesus movement
LGBT Protestants
American performers of Christian music
American lesbian musicians
Lesbian singers
Lesbian songwriters
Living people
American women hymnwriters
20th-century American LGBT people
21st-century American LGBT people